Ireland has participated in the biennial classical music competition Eurovision Young Musicians 4 times since its debut in 1986, most recently taking part in 1994. Ireland have failed to reach the final in every contest to date.

Participation overview 
Table key

See also
Ireland in the Eurovision Song Contest
Ireland in the Eurovision Dance Contest
Ireland in the Junior Eurovision Song Contest

References

External links 
 Eurovision Young Musicians

Countries in the Eurovision Young Musicians